HMCS Wasaga (pennant J162) was a  constructed for the Royal Canadian Navy during the Second World War. Entering service in 1941, the minesweeper took part in the Battle of the Atlantic and the invasion of Normandy. Following the end of the war, the vessel was sold in 1946 and broken up for scrap in 1947.

Design and description
They came in two versions powered by different engines; those with a diesel engines and those with vertical triple-expansion steam engines. Wasaga was of the latter design and was larger than her diesel-engined cousins. She had a complement of 6 officers and 77 enlisted.

Wasaga had two vertical triple-expansion steam engines, each driving one shaft, using steam provided by two Admiralty three-drum boilers.

Wasaga was armed with a single quick-firing (QF) /40 caliber Mk IV gun mounted forward. This was later replaced with a 12-pounder 12 cwt HA gun. For anti-aircraft purposes, the minesweeper was equipped with one QF 2-pounder Mark VIII and two single-mounted QF 20 mm Oerlikon guns. The 2-pounder gun was later replaced with a powered twin 20 mm Oerlikon mount. As a convoy escort, Wasaga was deployed with 40 depth charges launched from two depth charge throwers and four chutes.

Operational history
The minesweeper was ordered as part of the 1939–40 building programme. The ship's keel was laid down on 3 September 1940 by Burrard Dry Dock Co, Ltd. at their yard in Vancouver. Named for a town in Ontario, Wasaga was launched on 23 January 1941 and commissioned into the Royal Canadian Navy on 1 July 1941 at Vancouver.

The ship was sent to the East Coast of Canada following commissioning, arriving at Halifax, Nova Scotia on 10 September 1941. The minesweeper was sent to Bermuda for workups and upon returning to Halifax, was assigned to the local convoy escort and patrol unit, Halifax Force. In March 1942 Wasaga joined Newfoundland Force, the patrol and convoy escort force operating out of St. John's, Newfoundland.

In January 1944, Wasaga transferred to Sydney Force, the local escort and patrol force operating out of Sydney, Nova Scotia and remained with them for a month before sailing to Europe in February. Upon arrival at Plymouth in March, Wasaga was assigned to 32nd Minesweeping Flotilla for minesweeping duties associated with the invasion of Normandy. The minesweeper later transferred to the all-Canadian 31st Minesweeping Flotilla. During the invasion, Wasaga and her fellow minesweepers swept and marked channels through the German minefields leading into the invasion beaches in the American sector. The 31st Minesweeping Flotilla swept channel 3 on 6 June, completing the task unmolested by the Germans. Wasaga remained with the unit until 30 September 1944, when the minesweeper returned to Canada for a refit at Charlottetown, Prince Edward Island.

Wasaga returned to European waters on 4 February 1945 and rejoined the 31st Minesweeping Flotilla at Plymouth. On 11 April, the minesweeper was damaged in a collision and was forced to withdraw from Allied attacks in the Gironde estuary region. The 31st Minesweeping Flotilla spent the final months of the war sweeping the English Channel. Wasaga returned to Canada in September 1945 and was paid off at Halifax on 6 October 1945. The ship was laid up at Shelburne, Nova Scotia until sold to Marine Industries in 1946 and broken up for scrap in 1947 at Sorel, Quebec.

References

Notes

Citations

Sources

External links
 
 

 

Bangor-class minesweepers of the Royal Canadian Navy
Ships built in British Columbia
1941 ships